Millerovsky District is an administrative and municipal district (raion), one of the forty-three in Rostov Oblast, Russia. It is located in the northwest of the oblast. Its administrative center is the town of Millerovo. Population: 68,360 (2010 Census);  The population of Millerovo accounts for 53.4% of the district's total population. The district contains the Millerovo air base.

References

Notes

Sources

 
Districts of Rostov Oblast